Alvise Cippico or Ivan Cippicus (16 September 1456 – 2 March 1504) was a Roman Catholic prelate who served as Archbishop of Zadar (1503) and Bishop of Famagusta (1488–1503).

Biography
Alvise Cippico was born in Trau on 16 September 1456. On 22 October 1488, he was appointed during the papacy of Pope Innocent VIII as Bishop of Famagusta. On 11 December 1503, he was appointed during the papacy of Pope Julius II as Archbishop of Zadar. He died in Rome on 2 March 1504 before he could take possession of the see. His successor Francesco de Pisauro, was appointed on 18 April 1505.

References

External links and additional sources
 (for Chronology of Bishops) 
 (for Chronology of Bishops) 
 (for Chronology of Bishops) 
 (for Chronology of Bishops) 

15th-century Roman Catholic bishops in Cyprus
16th-century Roman Catholic bishops in Croatia
Bishops appointed by Pope Innocent VIII
Bishops appointed by Pope Julius II
1456 births
1504 deaths